Pacal Bayley (born October 21, 1983), better known by his stage name DJ Pain 1, is an American record producer and DJ from Madison, Wisconsin. He has produced for artists including Young Jeezy, 50 Cent, Schoolboy Q, Ludacris, Lil Baby,  Sarkodie, Rick Ross, Public Enemy, and Nipsey Hussle.

Career
DJ Pain 1, the producer SPIN Magazine online referred to as a "beat-master," placed his first major composition with Young Jeezy on the album The Recession. The album went on to sell over a million copies domestically earning Bayley an RIAA Platinum Certification.  He is also known for his music production and marketing tutorials on YouTube as well as the free sample and sound kits he releases regularly.

Since earning his platinum record, Pain 1 has composed tracks for numerous artists, earned a master's degree in the field of applied English linguistics, released both a mixtape series entitled Painkillerz as well as an instrumental series entitled Undressed Instrumentals, and frequently tours the U.S. as tour DJ for Coast 2 Coast LIVE.  From the year 2008 until the year 2012, Pain 1 hosted Madison's first FM Hip-Hop mixshow on WJQM (93.1 Jamz).  He returned to the station in 2017 as the Tuesday night "Freakmix" mixshow DJ.

In late 2016, DJ Pain 1, along with fellow Madison native Ted Park, signed a record deal with Capitol Records/Universal Music (FR) following the viral success of the song "Hello (Who Is This)."

Along with fellow producers DreamLife, Memory, and STACKTRACE, he forms the collective The Vintage Vxndals.

As of February 5th, 2022, DJ Pain 1 has been RIAA certified multi-platinum after co-producing "Switch it Up" for Pooh Shiesty on his album Shiesty Season

Production discography

2008
Young Jeezy - The Recession
Don't Do It
2008 Billboard R&B/Hip Hop Albums

Stat Quo
Bad Man
The Invisible Man
Stylin'
The Status Report
B.A.N.

 Emilio Rojas 
Like a Drummer

2009
Young Chris - The Network 2
Here I Come

Yo Gotti
Save da Trap (Letter to Young Jeezy & Gucci Mane)

God-Des and She - Three
Love Machine
Respect My Fresh
Blue in the Face
Drum Circle

Alfamega
Round One

2010
Lil Chuckee
Big Money Talk (feat. 2 Chainz & Yo Gotti)

Charles Lee Ray
Road to Success

Smoke DZA - Substance Abuse
Ginger Rothstein

Roccett - America's Nightmare
I'm the Shit (feat. Dae One)

Rebstar - Rebstar’s Arrival 2.0
I Like it (feat. Ray J)

Chuck D (as Mistachuck) - Don't Rhyme for the Sake of Riddlin' 
Tear Down That Wall

I-20 - The Sleeping Giant
Still Grinding

Vado
M.O.V.A.D.O. (Fly Again) (feat. Mavado)

Vivian Green - Beautiful
Search is Over

Snow tha Product
Fresher Than a Mug

2011
Kool G Rap - Offer You Can't Refuse
The Fix

Rebstar - Rebstar’s Arrival 2.0
Down

U.S.D.A. - CTE or Nothing
CTE or Nothing  (feat. Young Jeezy)
(Co-produced with Djay Cas)

Mistah F.A.B. -  Love Lies and Alibis
That's My Chick (feat. Tiggy)

Jim Jones
The Crash

Masspike Miles - The Road Less Traveled
Making Love
Ur Kind (feat. Smoke Bulga)

Meek Mill
Love This City (feat. Masspike Miles, Pill, Magazeen & Triple C's)

Smokes
Roots (feat. Joell Ortiz & Rain)

Rain - The Magic Hour II (full album)
1. Intro
2. Big Time
3. Still High
4. No Coming Back
5. Come On 5
6. Rich Forever
7. Ring Size Intermission
8. Then I Met You (feat. Krillz)
9. Peaked Lapels (feat. Keep Pushin)
10. Magic Moments
11. Once In a While (feat. Krillz)
12. Miracles
13. Forgive or Forget (feat. Keep Pushin)

I-20
100 Percent
Throw it Out

The Grey Area
Hood Shit (feat. Gudda Gudda)
War Shit (feat. The Outlawz)
My Beautiful Bitch (feat. Osei)

Shyne
Trunk Full (feat. Gucci Mane)

New Boyz
Backseat (Official Urban Remix)

Black Rob - Game Tested, Streets Approved
No Fear (feat. Sean Price)

Papoose
King of the Hood (feat. Nathaniel)

Vado - Slime Flu 2
What's Poppin'
All the Drama

2012

50 Cent - 5 (Murder by Numbers)
Can I Speak to You (feat. Schoolboy Q)

Rain
Kick it Over Here

The Magic hour 3
Intro
Lights Down Low (feat. Cardi)
I'll Stay
You Were Here

GT Garza, Scooby, Kirko Bangz, ProPain, Greezo, Brian Angel
Living To Die

Masspike Miles - Say Hello to Forever
Say Hello to Forever

Young Buck - Live Loyal Die Rich
Personal (feat. Cruna)

Soulja Boy
Reppin 4 The Ocean

Gorilla Zoe - Walkin' Money Machine 
Work (feat. PTE)

Jim Jones - Vampire Life 2 : F.E.A.S.T. The Last Supper
Top of the Year (feat. Sen City, Mel Matrix, T.W.O, Lady H, Trav, Shoota, Chris Luck, Pure

Huey
Feel it

Doughboy - Office Referrals
100 (feat. Huey & Young Rhome)

Mistah F.A.B.
Killin' These Rap Niggas (feat. Fred the Godson & Ya Boy)

Beastmode
Bishop

Scotty Boi - A.W.O.L. 2
To the Money (feat. Traxx Sanders)
Fuego

Public Enemy - The Evil Empire of Everything
The Evil Empire of...

Most of My Heroes Still Don't Appear on No Stamp
Hoovermusic
(Co-produced with Divided Souls Entertainment)

Ransom - Winter's Coming
Insanity

Chi Ali
Baby Sky (feat. Maino)
Girls Around Me (feat. Mysonne)

2 Pistols - Arrogant
Top Shotta
My Life Freestyle

Kállay Saunders
Tonight (feat. Rebstar)

Joe Budden - A Loose Quarter
Pain Won't Stop

King L - DrilluminatiMy Hoes They Do Drugs (feat. Pusha T & Juicy J)

Bo Deal - Welcome to KlanvilleIf Tomorrow Never ComesThe Chicago Code 3 : RevelationsGet Paid (feat. EBone Hoodrich)

2013

The Game
Last Supper (feat. Jadakiss, Styles P & AR-16)

Jaheim - Appreciation DayI Found You

Kirko Bangz - Progression IIIFor My Niggas
(Co-produced with Trakksounds and Albie Dickson)

Doe B - Baby JesusGod Flow

Young Buck - Strictly 4 Traps N Trunks 44 Free Young Buck editionCompare Me
(Co-produced with Chinky P)

Loaded Lux - You Gon' Get This WorkMillionaire Dollar Dreaming
Jammin
Takes 2

Black Rob
About Me

I-20 - The Amphetamine Manifesto 2Lose My Cool
Live It Up (feat. Fiend)
Southern Charm
We Deserve To Shine

Adrian Marcel - 7 Days of WeakRaphael Saadiq Intro

Mysonne - Coast 2 Coast 236Came From Nothing (feat. Chi Ali & Nathaniel)

Winners Circle - Winners CircleRunner Up (feat. Nipsey Hussle)
Day in the Life

Doughboy, Jibbs, Huey, Tef Poe, Trixie & Vega
100 Remix

Masspike Miles - Skky Miles 3 #BlocksNBedrooms - Pt. 1. #BedroomsWhispering Tears

Euroz
Purple Clouds

2014

Slaughterhouse - House RulesOffshore

Lil Bibby - Free Crack 2We Are Strong (feat. Kevin Gates)

Joe Budden
Nothing Changed (feat. Tsu-Surf & Ransom)Some Love LostAlive (feat. Emanny)

Ransom - True To The Game Pt. 5 : The Duffle Bag EditionVietnam (feat. Joe Budden)

Starlito - TheoriesG. Thomas (1991-2013) (feat. Don Trip)

D Lux - No Filters : Chapter 1Bomb Bomb (feat. Ace Hood)
(Co-produced with Traxx Sanders)
She Bout Her Money (feat. Paul Wall)
She's A Model (feat. John Brown)
Tryna See You (feat. Project Pat)
Work It
Juke It (feat. Mistah F.A.B.)
I Found You

2 Pistols - Comin Back HardLingo (feat. OJ da Juiceman)

Young Buck - Strictly 4 Traps N Trunks 82Strapped  (feat. Highside)

Sole & DJ Pain 1 - Death Drive (full album)
1. Death Drive
2. The Gauntlet
3. Don't Riot
4. Baghdad Shake
5. War (feat. Decomposure)
6. The Janitor's Son (feat. Pedestrian)
7. Rap Game Darwin
8. Coal (feat. Decomposure)
9. Hey Liberals (feat. Jesse Lester)
10. Y.D.E.L.O.
11. Old Gods Ain't Dead (feat. Sean Bonnette)
12. Unscorch the Earth
13. The Teachings of Cube

Chuck D - The Black In ManGive We The Pride (feat. Mavis Staples)
Ican (feat. PE 2.0)

Frenchie - Fukk FameBirds & Keys (feat. Trae Tha Truth)

PE 2.0 - People Get ReadyPeople Get Ready (feat. Chuck D)

2015
Ludacris - Ludaversal (Deluxe)Money (feat. Rick Ross)

G Herbo aka Lil Herb - Ballin Like I'm Kobe (Deluxe)Countin' 100s

Gunplay - Living LegendLeave Da Game (feat. Masspike Miles)

Do or Die - Picture This IIExpensive Love (feat. Twista)

Shawty Lo
This & That

Nutso - Divided SoulHustler's Spirit (feat. Trae tha Truth)

Sharaya J
No Filter

Emilio Rojas
All I Know (feat. Hi-Rez)L.I.F.E.This Can't Be Life

Starlito - I'm Moving to HoustonCashville to Memphis to Houston (feat. Young Dolph & Killa Kyleon)
Number 1/Like Penny (feat. Dee-1)

Rayven Justice - The Cassette PlaylistI Like (feat. Bizzy Crook)
((Co-produced with Bizness Boi)

PE 2.0 - InsPirEdBlack Thesis (feat. KRS-One)
Survival

Kutt Calhoun - Kuttin LooseHandz Up (Shut Shit Down) (feat. Wanz)

2016
Royce da 5'9"- Trust the ShooterTrust the Shooter (feat. Smoke DZA)
Universe (Interlude)LayersDope! (feat. Loren W. Oden)

Ted Park
Varsity (feat. OG Maco & Wave Chapelle)
Hello, Who Is This?

Grafh - Pain Killers ReloadedActive (feat. Bun B)

Sole & DJ Pain 1 - Nihilismo (full album)
1. Generation Fucked (feat. Church Fire)
2. Too Small to Fail
3. Capitalism Is Tearing Us Apart (feat. Decomposure)
4. Flood
5. Extinction Event
6. Hostage Crisis (feat. Chris Hannah of Propagandhi & Scott Crow)
7. National Bird
8. My Brand
9. Self Destruct (feat. The Delta Mirror)
10. Walk The Plank (feat. Jah Boogie)
11. Exodus (feat. Ceschi)
12. Our Words
13. Battle Of Humans

DJ Omoney
Weirdo (feat. Kevin Gates & T.Rone)

Ye Ali
Wet 2x (feat. Dougie F)

Kutt Calhoun
Alive (feat. The Jokerr)
King Kutt

Balize - Under the MattressShower (feat. Nipsey Hussle)
(Co-produced with Superstaarbeats)

2017
Public Enemy - Nothing Is Quick in the DesertNothing is Quick in the Desert
So Be it (feat. Jahi)

Driicky Graham
Tabs

Ted Park
No Go (feat. Okasian)
(Co-produced with Memory and Stacktrace)

Sole & DJ Pain 1 - No God Nor Country (full album)
1. F.T.L.
2. Extremist
3. Outsiders
4. The World Ain't Yours
5. Wrong Side Of The Law
6. Enough (feat. Decomposure)
7. D.T.A.
8. Godless (feat. Decomposure)
9. Karma Police II
10. Be Free (feat. Ted Park)
11. Company Time
12. Born In The Storm
13. Not Here

Brian Angel - Daybreak : Tha AppetizerOne Time (feat. Chedda Da Connect)
Competition

Rebstar - dont stress Me1. Almost Forgot
2. Thriller
3. Bella (feat. Naked People)
4. dont stress Me
5. Hahaha
6. Alright Alright Alright Alright (feat. Baby Mike)
7. 365
(Co-produced with Rebstar and RuzBeatz)
8. Hello Kitty (feat. LE SINNER)
13. My Little Sister

2018

Stevie Stone & JL - Kontra-BandNot One of Them (feat. Tech N9ne)

Rae Sremmurd - SR3MMGrowed Up
(Co-produced with Marz and Mike Will Made It)

Ted Park - Plugged InHands in the Air (feat. Jay Park)
Corny (feat. Dumbfoundead)

La Même Gang - La Même Tape : LinkstersKnow Me (feat. Sarkodie)

Wendy's
4 for $4
(Co-produced with Vizion)

L2B Gang
Qui nous l'empêche

Horseshoe G.A.N.G. - Ghetto CARtunesHouse Keys
Lyrical Gang Bang Life

Epic Beard Men - Season 1Not Ur Uber
(Provided Scratches)

Hayce Lemsi - La HauteDolce Narco (feat. Lefa)
(Co-produced with Majestic Drama)

2019

Polo G
In The Game

Wiz Khalifa - Fly Times Vol. 1 : The Good Fly YoungTaylor Life (feat. Sosamann)
(Co-produced with Statik Selektah, Dreamlife and Stacktrace)

Sammie - EverlastingTimes 10 (feat. Lil Baby)

Stevie Stone - Set in Stone IFlip Mode (feat. Tech N9ne)

Bun B & Statik Selektah - TrillStatikConcrete (feat. Westside Gunn & Termanology)
(Co-produced with Statik Selektah and Dreamlife)

Ted Park - They Don’t KnowOn My Way
Ugly
(Co-produced with Sheory and Stacktrace)
Drippin' (feat. Jessi)

Jarren Benton - The Bully FreestylesEnter Sandman

Nino Man - Juu HurdMy Side (feat. Jim Jones)

Dee-1 - God and GirlsPut Me In Coach

Compound
All I'm Talkin (feat. Jim Jones)

Astronomy Club : The Sketch Show (Netflix Original)
Theme Song (feat. Grand Puba)

2020

Statik Selektah - The Balancing ActKeep it Moving (feat. Nas, Joey Badass) & Gary Clark Jr.
(Co-produced with Statik Selektah & Vintage Vxndals)
Time (feat. Jack Harlow)
(Co-produced with Statik Selektah & Vintage Vxndals)

Russ - Shake the Snow Globe (Deluxe)You Coulda Left Me Alone
(Co-produced with Vintage Vxndals)

Ari Lennox 
Chocolate Pomegranate
(Co-produced with Elite, and the Vintage Vxndals)

The Lox - Living Off XperienceCome Back
(Co-produced with Statik Selektah, Dreamlife, Memory and Stacktrace)

Public Enemy - What You Gonna Do When the Grid Goes Down?Go At It

Maino - Die a LegendStill Here

SiAngie Twins - Good Girls Gone BadNever Be Me

Cipha Da Lyrical - Cold BloodedCold Blooded (Intro)
Serious (feat. Thrax the Upmost & Young Act) (Co-produced with Dreamlife)
Ave Legend (Co-produced with Dreamlife)
Progression (feat. Chef Trez & Aplu$)
The Hood Know (feat. J-Hood & GS Vague) (Co-produced with Mr IBTU)
So Lost (feat. Tina Jean)
Too Close (Co-produced with Prodlem)
Tonight (Co-produced with Dylan Graham)

Orlando Brown 
Blue Mythology

CJ Fly - RUDEBWOYShow You
(Co-produced with Statik Selektah, Dreamlife, Memory and Stacktrace)
City We From (feat. Conway The Machine)
(Co-produced with Statik Selektah, Dreamlife, Memory and Stacktrace)

2021

Pooh Shiesty - Shiesty Season (Deluxe)Switch It Up (feat. G Herbo, No More Heroes)
(Co-produced with Gold Haze & JD Feng)

KXNG Crooked &  Canibus
Aluminum Oxide

Orlando Brown (actor)
Smiled On Me

2022

Joey Badass 
Head High
(Co-produced with Statik Selektah and Dreamlife)

Mistah F.A.B. - Black DesignerAndré Leon Talley (feat. Rick Ross)

Crooked I and Joell Ortiz - Rise & Fall of Slaughter House''
Fukglasshouse
Coastin' (Featuring Traxx Sanders, Co-produced by Dreamlife)

Krayzie Bone, RA The Rugged Man, A-F-R-O, and Timbo King 
Now or Never

Meechy Darko Ft. Kirk Knight, Vita 
Cursed

GANG51E JUNE
Liliana's Interlude (Co-produced by Honorable C.N.O.T.E., M80 and Vintage Vxndals)

Joey Fatts Ft. Blxst 
Floor Seats

Lah Pat 
Rodeo (AKA Pony)

2023

Lah Pat 
Rodeo (Remix) ft. Flo Milli

Baby Drill 
How Ya Doin? (Co-produced by ATL Jacob, Hendrix, and Dreamlife)

References

External links
Download Free Beats from DJ Pain 1
Official Website
Official YouTube Channel

1983 births
Living people
American hip hop DJs
American hip hop record producers
Midwest hip hop musicians
Musicians from Madison, Wisconsin
Businesspeople from Madison, Wisconsin